Phil Pfister (born May 15, 1971) is an American former strongman competitor and winner of the 2006 World's Strongest Man competition on September 23, 2006 in Sanya, China. He was the first American to win since Bill Kazmaier in 1982.  Pfister stands  and weighs .

Prior to 2006, Pfister's previous best finishes in the World's Strongest Man were fourth place in 1998 in Tangier, and fourth place again in 2001 in Victoria Falls. He placed fourth at the 2007 and 2008 WSM contests, and seventh in 2009.

While qualifying for his 4th-place finish in Victoria Falls, during an event known as the Hercules Hold, Pfister made a verbal promise that he would be the man responsible for bringing the World's Strongest Man title back to the United States. He went on to set two qualifier records in the Hercules Hold and in the Atlas Stones, but was unable to contend in the finals against the Scandinavian competitors who took the podium finishes that year, Magnus Samuelsson from Sweden, Janne Virtanen from Finland, and Svend Karlsen from Norway, respectively.  Pfister has also achieved a podium finish at the Arnold Strongman Classic when he came third in 2002.

Retiring after the 2009 Competition, Pfister currently comments for the World's Strongest Man competition on ESPN2 along with Bill Kazmaier and Todd Harris.

Personal life
Pfister worked as a firefighter and currently resides in Charleston, West Virginia with his son Wyatt. He appeared in the 2005 film The Protector starring Tony Jaa, as one of the Fortune Teller's henchmen. He also made an appearance on Are You Smarter Than a Fifth Grader? on April 17, 2008 and won $25,000, as well as an appearance on an episode of Airline.

References

External links
Video clip of Pfister containing a news reel and competition footage from 1998

1970 births
Living people
Sportspeople from Charleston, West Virginia
American powerlifters
American strength athletes